Nada Taleb Golmie is an American computer scientist and engineer. She is chief of the wireless networks division in the Communications Technology Laboratory at the National Institute of Standards and Technology.

Career and education 
Golmie joined the National Institute of Standards and Technology (NIST) in 1993 as a research engineer. She completed a Ph.D. in computer science at University of Maryland, College Park. Her 2002 thesis was titled Coexistence of Bluetooth and 802.11 networks. Golmie's doctoral advisor was A. Udaya Shankar. Golmie is the chief of the wireless networks division in the NIST Communications Technology Laboratory. Her research in media access control and protocols for wireless networks led to over 200 technical papers presented at professional conferences, journals, and contributed to international standard organizations and industry led consortia. Golmie is a member of the NIST Public Safety Communication Research program and leads the efforts on the simulation modeling and evaluation of LTE in support of public safety communications. She leads several projects related to the modeling and evaluation of future generation wireless systems and protocols and serves as a co-chair for the 5G mmWave Channel Model Alliance.

Selected works

References

External links 
 
 

Living people
20th-century American engineers
20th-century women engineers
21st-century American engineers
21st-century women engineers
American women engineers
National Institute of Standards and Technology people
American computer scientists
American women computer scientists
University of Maryland, College Park alumni
Year of birth missing (living people)
20th-century American women
21st-century American women